Aleksei Turovski (born 4 August 1946 in Moscow) is an Estonian zoologist and ethologist, specialising in parasitology and zoosemiotics.  In 1973, he graduated from Tartu University with a degree in zoology; since 1972 he's been working in the Tallinn Zoo.  In 1976–2001, Turovski worked in the Estonian Marine Institute.

Turovski has been recognised as the Guardian of Estonian Life Science in 2007 for his work in popularising cultures of animals.

References

External links 
 Turovski's lectures in Radio Night University

Living people
1946 births
Estonian zoologists
Estonian parasitologists
University of Tartu alumni
Estonian semioticians
Russian Jews
Estonian Jews
Estonian people of Russian descent
Recipients of the Order of the White Star, 5th Class